The Commonwealth Poetry Prize was an annual poetry prize established in 1972, for a first published book of English poetry from a country other than the United Kingdom. It was initially administered jointly by the Commonwealth Institute and the National Book League.

In 1985 the prize received sponsorship from British Airways. £11,000 prize money was provided for the prize, which was advertized as "the world's most comprehensive award for poetry".

Poems by 35 winners of the prize, each introduced with a brief biographical note, were collected in a 1987 anthology, Under another Sky.

The prize was discontinued in 1987, and a Commonwealth Writers Prize established in its place.

Commonwealth prize winners

References

Awards established in 1972
Awards disestablished in 1987
Commonwealth literary awards
Poetry awards